Dominik Straga (born June 20, 1988) is a Croatian swimmer, who specialized in freestyle and butterfly events. He represented his nation Croatia at the 2008 Summer Olympics and has claimed multiple Croatian championship titles and three national records in the long and short course freestyle (100 and 200 m), and butterfly (50, 100, and 200 m). He also won two bronze medals in the same stroke (50 and 100 m) at the 2006 European Junior Swimming Championships in Palma de Mallorca, Spain, with respective times of 24.62 and 54.51.

Straga competed for the Croatian swimming team in the men's 200 m freestyle at the 2008 Summer Olympics in Beijing. Leading up to the Games, he finished with a third-place time in 1:51.53 to eclipse a FINA B standard (1:52.53) by exactly a second at the Croatian Open Championships in Dubrovnik. Swimming on the outside in heat three, Straga overhauled a sub-1:50 barrier to smash a scintillating Croatian record time of 1:49.63 for the second spot, just a 0.59 of a second behind Papua New Guinea's Ryan Pini. Straga's fantastic record-breaking finish would not be enough to put him through to the semifinals, finishing thirty-seventh overall in the prelims.

References

External links
Profile – Croatian Olympic Committee
NBC Olympics Profile

1988 births
Living people
Croatian male swimmers
Olympic swimmers of Croatia
Swimmers at the 2008 Summer Olympics
Croatian male freestyle swimmers
Male butterfly swimmers
Sportspeople from Rijeka
21st-century Croatian people